Theognostus the Grammarian was a 9th-century writer, known for his book Canons (Canones in Latin and most citations). This work is one of the source texts for the Oxford Greek-English Lexicon, a standard work on the Ancient Greek language. He also wrote a lost historical work.

References
 John Anthony Cramer (ed.): Anecdota Graeca e codd. ms. bibliothecarum Oxoniensium. Vol. 2. Oxford 1835.

Byzantine grammarians
9th-century Byzantine writers